The Great Northern Whalekill is the fourth full-Length album released by the Icelandic group Mínus.

Track listing

"Cat's Eyes" – 4:30
"Black and Bruised" – 3:17
"Shoot the Moon" - 2:56
"Kiss Yourself" – 2:33
"Throwaway Angel" – 4:05
"Not Afraid" – 3:06
"Rip It Up" – 2:53
"Rhythm Cure" – 3:02
"Futurist" – 3:48
"Shadow Heart" – 4:08
"Weekend Lovers" – 3:27

Personnel
Krummi	 - 	Vocals
Frosti  -      Guitar
Bjarni	 - 	Guitar
Bjössi	 - 	Drums
Johnny  -      Bass

References

Mínus albums
2007 albums